Skhawat Ali (born 5 May 1985) is a cricketer who has played One Day Internationals for Hong Kong. He participated in 17th Incheon Asian Games 2014. He also participated in the May 2015 Intercontinental Cricket Cup in Namibia, representing Hong Kong National Cricket Team. He made his first class debut in Pakistan vs Hong Kong at Karachi - June 24, 2008. He also played for JD Jaguars in the Hong Kong DTC T20 Blitz (2017) alongside Darren Sammy of West Indies. He is also a full-time Physical Education teacher in Hong Kong. He is a certified cricket coach for ACC level 2. He is also certified sports coach in Rugby, Badminton, Lacrosse and Pickleball.

References

External links 

 

1985 births
Living people
Hong Kong One Day International cricketers
Hong Kong cricketers
Cricketers at the 2014 Asian Games
Asian Games competitors for Hong Kong